In computing, Code space  may refer to:
 In memory address space:
 code space, where machine code is stored.
 For a character encoding:
 code space (or codespace), the range of code points.